Acantholeberis is a genus of crustaceans belonging to the monotypic family Acantholeberidae.

Species:

Acantholeberis curvirostris 
Acantholeberis dentata

References

Branchiopoda
Branchiopoda genera